Robin Himmelmann (born 5 February 1989) is a German professional footballer who plays as a goalkeeper for 2. Bundesliga club Holstein Kiel.

Career
Himmelmann joined FC St. Pauli in 2012 from Schalke 04 II. After many years of being number one goalkeeper at the club, he lost his spot and agreed the termination with the club in January 2021.

In February 2021, Himmelmann signed a contract for the remainder of the 2020–21 season with Belgian First Division A club Eupen. After the club had initially announced in June 2021 that his contract would not be extended, he ended up signing a one-year deal with Eupen in July 2021.

In January 2023, Himmelmann joined 2. Bundesliga club Holstein Kiel on a short-term contract until the end of the season, with the option for a further year.

References

External links
 

1989 births
Living people
People from Moers
Sportspeople from Düsseldorf (region)
Footballers from North Rhine-Westphalia
Association football goalkeepers
German footballers
SV 19 Straelen players
1. FC Union Solingen players
Rot-Weiss Essen players
FC Schalke 04 II players
FC St. Pauli players
K.A.S. Eupen players
Holstein Kiel players
Regionalliga players
2. Bundesliga players
Belgian Pro League players
German expatriate footballers
German expatriate sportspeople in Belgium
Expatriate footballers in Belgium